Consort Wu may refer to:

 Empress Wu (Zhaolie) (died 245), wife of Liu Bei (Emperor Zhaolie of Shu Han)
 Wu Zetian (624–705), consort of Emperor Gaozong of Tang who founded her own dynasty
 Empress Zhenshun (died 737), concubine of Emperor Xuanzong of Tang
 Lady Wu (Qian Liu's wife) (858–919), wife of Qian Liu (King Wusu of Wuyue)
 Wu Hanyue (913–952), concubine of Qian Hongchu (King Wenyi of Wuyue)
 Empress Wu (Song dynasty) (1115–1197), wife of Emperor Gaozong of Song
 Empress Dowager Xiaoyi (Ming dynasty) (1397–1462), concubine of the Xuande Emperor
 Deposed Empress Wu (died 1509), wife of the Chenghua Emperor
 Consort Ning (died 1734), concubine of the Yongzheng Emperor

See also
Lady Wu (Sun Jian's wife) (died 202), posthumous name Empress Wulie
Wu Shun (623–665), Wu Zetian's sister